Caythorpe could be

Caythorpe, Lincolnshire
Caythorpe, Nottinghamshire